Gelanesaurus cochranae, also known commonly as Cochran's neusticurus, is a species of lizard in the family Gymnophthalmidae. The species is native to northwestern South America.

Etymology
The specific name, cochranae, was chosen in honor of American herpetologist Doris Mable Cochran.

Geographic range
G. cochranae is found in Colombia and Ecuador.

Habitat

Reproduction
G. cochranae is oviparous.

References

Further reading
Burt CE, Burt MD (1941). "South American Lizards in the Collection of the American Museum of Natural History". Bulletin of the American Museum of Natural History 61 (7): 227–395. (Neusticurus ecpleopus cochranæ, new subspecies, pp. 350–352, Figure 9).
Doan TM, Castoe TA (2005). "Phylogenetic taxonomy of the Cercosaurini (Squamata: Gymnophthalmidae), with new genera for species of Neusticurus and Proctoporus ". Zoological Journal of the Linnean Society 143: 405–416. (Potamites cochranae, new combination).
Torres-Carvajal O, Lobos SE, Venegas PJ, Chávez G, Aguirre-Peñafiel V, Zurita D, Echevarría LY (2016). "Phylogeny and biogeography of the most diverse clade of South American gymnophthalmid lizards (Squamata,Gymnophthalmidae, Cercosaurinae)". Molecular Phylogenetics and Evolution 99: 63–75. (Gelanesaurus cochranae, new combination).
Uzzell TM (1966). "Teiid lizards of the genus Neusticurus (Reptilia, Sauria)". Bull. American Mus. Nat. Hist. 132 (5): 279–327. (Neusticurus cochranae, new status, pp. 307–309).

cochranae
Reptiles described in 1931
Taxa named by Charles Earle Burt
Taxa named by May Danheim Burt
Taxobox binomials not recognized by IUCN